Dhakuria is a locality in the city of Kolkata, (previously Calcutta) in West Bengal, India. It is located in the southern part of the city and is surrounded by Ballygunge and Kasba in the north, Haltu in the east, Jadavpur/ Garia in the south and Lake Gardens/ Jodhpur Park in the west. It has a Postal Index Number (PIN) code of 700031. Some localities adjacent to Golpark and Jodhpur Park also have Postal Index Number (PIN) code of 700029 and 700068 respectively.

Prominent landmarks include Dhakuria railway station, bus terminal # 37, Dhakuria AMRI Hospital and Dakshinapan Shopping Complex.

History

The history of Dhakuria stretches back to the early 1800s. Even after large scale modernization in the last few decades, there are several buildings that still exist today that predate 1900.

The rapid population growth of Dhakuria, similar to rest of the City of Kolkata, can be traced back to the late fifties. At the time the southern city limits were up to Ballygunge Lake areas (now known as Golpark). By the early sixties, the neighbouring locality Jodhpur Park had also become an attractive spot for several upscale single-family residential home development projects.

The areas beyond the Eastern railway tracks at Golpark started developing with large numbers of people settling in. The area was very different from the neighbouring Ballygunge. While Ballygunge dotted the homes of the rich, wide tree-lined roads (at Golpark, Southern Avenue), Dhakuria was marked with comparatively narrow lanes and bylanes. The nomenclature of most of the sub localities of this area bears the mark of age-old family dominances viz. Roypara, Bannerjeepara, Daspara, Ghoshpara, Mukherjeepara, Biswaspara, Naskarpara etc. The Pakrashi's were amongst the first few families who came and started residing here (the early 1820s). The Dhakuria Kalibari was also founded by the Pakrashi family.

After the introduction of Dakshinapan, a multi-storied shopping mall and one of the first of its kind in Kolkata, (at the west boundary of Dhakuria in the early 80s), the area started getting an upmarket look. Since then, Dhakuria's population is swelling with well-educated, middle-class people because of its schools, low crime rate and proximity to other important locations.

Four Kolkata Municipal Corporation (KMC) wards are spread all over Dhakuria (Wards 90, 91, 92 and 93). Dhakuria is currently under the Rashbehari Assembly and Kasba Assembly Territory. Both Assembly Territories are under Kolkata Dakshin Parliamentary Constituency.

Famous people from Dhakuria 
 Dr. Shyama prasad Sinha Ray retired member of Central for Ground Water Board 
 Pritish Chakraborty eminent Bollywood Actor, Producer, Director, Singer, Writer
 Suchitra Bhattacharya, eminent writer.
 Avix Kumar Mitter, Omniscient
Barunansu Kumar Sarkar, Social entrepreneur
 Sandhya Mukherjee

See also
 Dhakuria (Vidhan Sabha constituency)
 Jadavpur
 Jodhpur Park

References

External links

Neighbourhoods in Kolkata